Fox League is an Australian subscription television channel dedicated to screening rugby league (both domestic and international) matches and related programming. It is owned by Fox Sports Pty Limited and is available throughout Australia on Foxtel. The channel was launched on 27 February 2017.

History
On 27 November 2015, the Australian Rugby League Commission announced that Fox Sports had secured the rights to air all National Rugby League games excluding the NRL Grand Final live for the 2018-22 seasons. Additionally, it was announced that the current rights agreement had been altered to allow Fox Sports to also have the live rights for all games excluding the Grand Final for the 2016 and 2017 seasons, however, a dedicated yet-to-be-named NRL channel to showcase these rights would not launch until the 2017 season.

In February 2017 it was announced the new channel would be called Fox League and would officially launch on 27 February 2017. Ultimately, Fox League replaced Fox Sports 2 on channel 502.

In 2017, the NRL preliminary finals had 418,000 and 407,000 viewers. In 2020, Fox League began carried in Canada on the pay streaming service DAZN.

Programming

Event coverage
Sports programming on Fox League includes the following:
National Rugby League (2017–present; every game live except the Grand Final)
Challenge Cup (2017–present)
Super League (2017–present; three live games per weekend)
Pacific Rugby League Internationals (2017–present)
The Knock On Effect NSW Cup (2017–present; one or two games per weekend & Finals)
Hostplus Cup (2017–present; One Finals Series Game Live each weekend & Grand Final Live)
NRL State Championship (2017–present)
Pre Season Challenge (2017–present) 
Charity Shield (2017–present)
Harvey Norman All-Stars (2017–present)
International Rugby League (2017–present)
NRL Touch Premiership (2018–present)
NRL Women's Premiership (2018–present)
Rugby League European Championship (2018–present)
Rugby League World Cup 9s (2019–present)
Oceania Cup (2019–present)
Rugby League World Cup (2022–present)
Women's Rugby League World Cup (2022–present)
Wheelchair Rugby League World Cup (2022–present)
Koori Knockout (2022–present)

Special events
 Dally M Awards (2017–present)
 Australian Rugby League Hall of Fame (2018–present)

News and analysis programming
Fox League airs several studio shows including the programs listed below: 
 Kia Thursday Night Football (2017–present) 
 VB Friday Night Footy (2017–present) 
 Bundaberg Rum NRL Super Saturday (2017–present) 
 Chemist Warehouse Sunday Ticket (2017–present) 
 KFC Monday Football  (2017-present; occasional)
 The Late Show With Matty Johns (2017–present)
Sunday Night with Matty Johns (2017–present)
 NRL 360 (2017–present)
 NRL Tonight (2017–present)
 The Sunday Wrap (2017–present)
 The Fan (2018–present)
 Big League Wrap (2018–present)
 NRL Try Time (2018–present)
 Controversy Corner (2018–present)
 The Matty Johns Podcast (2019–present)
 The Final 5 (2020–present) 
 Top 5 Rivalries (2020–present)
 Vossy's Awesome 80s (2020–present)
 Season's Best (2020–present)
 Benji (2022–present)

Former programming
 League 13 – to –1 (2017)
 League Legends (2017)
 On the Couch with Sterlo (2017)
 Narrow World of Sports (2017–2020)
NRL Under-20s (2017)
 Queenslanders Only (2017–2019)
League Life (2017–2019)
NRL Schoolboy Cup (2017–2019)
 The Greatest (2018–2019)
NRL Nines (2020)
Auckland Rugby League (2020)
Auckland Rugby League National 20's (2021–2022)

Personnel
Network executives announced a number of key hosting personnel at the public launch of the station on 16 February 2017.

Network personalities and the media attended the launch for Fox League's 2018 programming slate on 20 February 2018. Further key hosting personnel were announced, in addition to some pre-existing roles from 2017.

Hosts

Thursday Night League
 Yvonne Sampson (2017–2021)
 Braith Anasta (2021)
 Jess Yates (2022–present)
 Lara Pitt (2022)

Friday Night Footy
 Jess Yates (2020–2021)
 Hannah Hollis (2022–present)
 Braith Anasta (2022)

Super Saturday
 Michael Ennis (2020–present)
 Yvonne Sampson (2017–present)
 Braith Anasta (2022)
 Jess Yates (2022)
 Hannah Hollis (2022)

Sunday Ticket
 Jess Yates (2017–2020)
 Lara Pitt (2018–2020, 2022)
 Hannah Hollis (2020–2021)
 Braith Anasta (2022)

Sunday Night with Matty Johns
 Matty Johns (2017–present)
 Bryan Fletcher (2017–present)
 Nathan Hindmarsh (2020–present)
 James 'The Professor' Rochford (2017–2021)
 Emma Freedman (2018–2021)

Controversy Corner
 Graeme Hughes (2018–21)
 Phil 'Buzz' Rothfield (2018–21)
 Bill Harrigan (2018–21)
 Steve Roach (2018–21)

NRL 360
 Ben Ikin (2017–2021)
 Yvonne Sampson (2021)
 Paul Kent (2017–present)
 Braith Anasta (2022–present)

Big League Wrap
 Yvonne Sampson (2018–2021)
 Michael Ennis (2018–2021)
 James Hooper (2018–2021)

NRL Try Time
 Lara Pitt (2018–2021)

The Fan
 Andrew Voss (2018–present)
 Lara Pitt (2020–present)

Queenslanders Only
 Hannah Hollis (2018)
 Mal Meninga (2017–2018)
 Kevin Walters (2017–2018)
 Corey Parker (2017–2018)
 Justin Hodges (2017–2018)
 Gorden Tallis (2017–2018)
 Robert 'Crash' Craddock (2017)

League Life
 Yvonne Sampson (2017–19)
 Lara Pitt (2017–19)
 Jess Yates (2017–19)
 Hannah Hollis (2017–19)

The Greatest
 Michael Ennis (2018)

The Late Show with Matty Johns
 Matty Johns (2017–present)
 Gorden Tallis (2017–present)
 Nathan Hindmarsh (2017–present)
 Bryan Fletcher (2017–present)
 Hannah Hollis (2017–19)
 Paul Kent (2017–19)

The Professor's Late Hit
(previously titled The Professor's Farewell Tour)
(also previously titled The Professor's Second Year Syndrome)
 James 'The Professor' Rochford (2017–2020)
 Brett Finch (2017–2018)
 Nathan Hindmarsh (2018–2020)
 Andrew Barnett (2018–2020)
 Chris Page (2017–2018)

Matty Johns Face to Face
 Matty Johns (2021–present)

Benji
 Benji Marshall (2022)

Commentators
 Warren Smith (play-by-play) (1995–present)
 Andrew Voss (play-by-play) (2015–present)
 Brenton Speed (play-by-play) (2017–present)
 Matt Russell (play-by-play, sideline) (2006–present)
 Matthew Nable (play-by-play) (2018), (narration) (2018–present)
 Dan Ginnane (play-by-play) (2019–present)
 Andy Raymond (sideline) (2008–2020)
 Greg Alexander (special comments) (1999–present)
 Gary Belcher (special comments) (2007–2017)
 Steve Roach (special comments) (2016–present)
 Mark Gasnier (special comments) (2012–2018)
 Braith Anasta (special comments) (2017–present)
 Michael Ennis (special comments) (2017–present)
 Brett Kimmorley (special comments, sideline) (2011–2020)
 Corey Parker (special comments) (2017–present)
 Mal Meninga (special comments) (2017–20)
 Brent Tate (special comments, sideline, North Queensland home games only) (2017–present)
 Kevin Walters (special comments) (2016–2020)
 Danny Buderus (special comments) (2016–2019)
 Justin Hodges (special comments, sideline) (2018)
 Gorden Tallis (special comments) (2006–present)
 Matthew Johns (special comments) (2019–present)
 Luke Lewis (special comments) (2019)
 Nathan Hindmarsh (special comments) (2013–present)
 Cooper Cronk (special comments) (2020–present)
 James Graham (special comments) (2021–present)
 Shane Flanagan (special comments) (2021–present)
 Benji Marshall (special comments) (2022)
 Tiana Penitani (special comments) (2023)
 Jessica Sergis (special comments (2023)

NSW Cup
 Jimmy Smith (play-by-play, special comments) (2012–2020)
 Owen McLeod (play-by-play) (2019–present)
 Andy Raymond (play-by-play) (2008–2019)
 Brett Kenny (special comments) (2018–2020)
 Emma Lawrence (sideline) (2017–2018)

NRLW
 Matt Russell (play-by-play) 
 Ben Homer (play-by-play) 
 Brenton Speed (play-by-play)

Watch NRL
Outside of Australia, New Zealand and the Pacific Islands, Fox League operates Watch NRL, a global streaming network. The network streams all games live, including State of Origin and the Grand Final, unlike its domestic counterpart, who broadcasts these games on delay.

See also

Fox Cricket
Fox Footy
Fox Netball
Fox Sports
Fox Sports 2 & Fox Soccer Plus (American simulcast partners for matches)
List of sports television channels

References

External links

Fox Sports (Australian TV network)
Television channels and stations established in 2017
2017 establishments in Australia
English-language television stations in Australia
Sports television networks in Australia
Rugby league mass media